Angel Goodrich (born February 24, 1990) is an American former professional basketball player, who played for the Tulsa Shock and Seattle Storm in the WNBA.

Background and family
Goodrich was born in Glendale, Arizona to Jonathan and Fayth (Goodrichard) Lewis. Jonathan is African-American; Fayth is Native American (Cherokee). Goodrich herself is an enrolled member of the Cherokee Nation.
  
Goodrich has two siblings, an older brother Zach Goodrich, and a younger sister Nikki Lewis. Lewis played college basketball for the Tabor Bluejays.

High school
Goodrich attended Sequoyah High School in Tahlequah, Oklahoma, where she was the first Division I  athletic scholarship recipient in the school's history. During her 4 years at the Cherokee-operated school, she lettered in basketball, softball and track and field, and earned All-State honors as a sprinter. She also led the school's basketball team, the Sequoyah Lady Indians, to three consecutive Class AAA state titles.

College
Goodrich played her college basketball for the Kansas Jayhawks at the University of Kansas. In her freshman year, she tore the anterior cruciate ligament (ACL) in her left knee, causing her to miss the entire season. The following year she tore the ACL in her right knee after only 15 games. Despite these setbacks, she still scored over 1,000 career points for KU, and became the Jayhawks' all-time career assists leader. Her assists total of 771  ranks as the third-highest in Big 12 Conference history.

In her senior year, Goodrich was a finalist for the Naismith Award, Wade Trophy, Wooden Award, Nancy Lieberman Award, and the USBWA Ann Meyers Drysdale Award. She also earned First Team All-Big 12 honors, and was a member of the WBCA All-Region 5 Team.

Kansas  statistics 

Source

Professional career
In 2013, Goodrich was selected in the third round of the WNBA draft (29th pick overall) by the Tulsa Shock. At the time she was the highest-drafted Native American player in the history of the WNBA. During the 2013–14 off-season, she played for Chevakata Vologda in the Russian Premier League. In 2014, she completed her second and final season for the Shock. In 2015, she was picked up on waivers by the Seattle Storm. In September 2015 Goodrich registered the first double-double (12 points, 10 rebounds) in her three-year WNBA career. Angel then went on to play half a season in Russia and a full season in Poland after she was let go from Seattle in 2016. Goodrich then turned her attention to teaching Native American youth at a basketball camp to help prepare them for playing at a collegiate level.

WNBA career statistics

|-
| style="text-align:left;"| 2013
| style="text-align:left;"| Tulsa
| 31 || 16 || 21.9 || .423 || .250 || .545 || 1.8 || 2.9|| 1.2 || 0.1 || 1.7 || 4.4
|-
| style="text-align:left;"| 2014
| style="text-align:left;"| Tulsa
| 28|| 0|| 6.5 || .500 || .500 || .571 || 0.4|| 0.8 || 0.3 || 0.0 || 0.7 || 1.0
|-
| style="text-align:left;"| 2015
| style="text-align:left;"| Seattle
| 23|| 5|| 15.8 || .408 || .300 || .500 || 1.7|| 3.0 || 0.6 || 0.0 || 1.2 || 3.0
|-
| style="text-align:left;"| Career
| style="text-align:left;"|3 years, 2 teams
| 82 || 21|| 14.9|| .426 || .273 || .538 || 1.3 || 2.2 || 0.7 || 0.0 || 1.2 || 2.9

See also

 Tahnee Robinson

References

External links

Chevakata Vologda stats at FIBAEUROPE.com
College profile at kuathletics.com

1990 births
21st-century Native Americans
Living people
African-American basketball players
American expatriate basketball people in Russia
American women's basketball players
Basketball players from Oklahoma
Cherokee Nation sportspeople
Kansas Jayhawks women's basketball players
McDonald's High School All-Americans
Native American basketball players
Native American sportspeople
Parade High School All-Americans (girls' basketball)
Sportspeople from Glendale, Arizona
People from Tahlequah, Oklahoma
Seattle Storm players
Tulsa Shock draft picks
Tulsa Shock players
Guards (basketball)
21st-century Native American women
21st-century African-American women
21st-century African-American sportspeople
Black Native American people